Shamsabad Rural District may refer to:
 Shamsabad Rural District (Khuzestan Province)
 Shamsabad Rural District (Markazi Province)